The Aidi is a Berber dog breed native to the Atlas Mountains of North Africa and is used as a livestock guardian, protecting herds of sheep and goats. It is most commonly found in Morocco, which holds the standard under the Fédération Cynologique Internationale. The Aidi is also found in Algeria, Tunisia and Libya. It possesses hunting capabilities and good scenting ability. In Morocco, it is often paired in hunting with the Sloughi, which chases down prey that the Aidi has located by scent.

History 

The Aidi is native from the Atlas Mountains of North Africa. The dog has never worked as a sheepdog even though the 1963 standard was published under the name Atlas Sheepdog; this was corrected in 1969. A courageous dog, the Aidi lived and worked in the Atlas Mountains of North Africa, protecting his owner and property from wildcats, other predators, and strangers. This breed has also been called the Berber, after the Berber tribes who utilized it, and bears some resemblance to the Pariah dog who is believed to share its ancestry. As a protector of the desert nomad tribes, the most alert and aggressive dogs were staked around the perimeter of the camp at night. The Aidi has not been highly regarded by the tribes historically, as are most dogs other than the Sloughi and other breeds regarded as noble. However, Moroccans have recently formed a club to protect the purity of the breed which has contributed so much in so many roles, as protector, hunter, police dog, and pet. Although the Aidi has been used primarily as a working dog, he has become more common as a house dog in the country. This breed also makes a good urban pet if he is given tasks and exercise enough to keep him satisfied and happy.

In color and flock guard work they share many characteristics of many livestock guardian dog breeds.

Appearance

The coat is heavy and soft. The head is bear-like and in proportion to the rest of the body. The breed has a tapered muzzle with a black or brown nose that usually matches the coat. Their jaws are strong with tight black or brown lips. The medium-sized ears are tipped forward and drop slightly. The eyes are medium, with a dark color and dark rims. Coat colours are white, black, black and white, pale red, and tawny.

Temperament 

The Aidi is energetic and highly protective and is said to make an outstanding watchdog. It is a powerful dog that is also agile, alert, and ready for action. As it is a sensitive breed, the dog needs to be given appropriate training from a very young age. It needs to be exposed to as many social conditions as possible so that it makes an ideal family pet.

See also
 Dogs portal
 List of dog breeds

References

Further reading

External links 

 

FCI breeds
Dog breeds originating in Africa
Livestock guardian dogs
Breeds originating from Indigenous people